The pubocervical ligament is a ligament connecting the side of the cervix to the pubic symphysis.

The collagen in the pubocervical ligament may be reduced in women with vaginal prolapse.

See also
 Cystocele

References

Ligaments of the torso